Alison Joy Byrnes is an Australian politician. She is a member of the Australian Labor Party (ALP) and was elected as a member for the New South Wales seat of Cunningham in the House of Representatives in the 2022 election.

Early life
Byrnes was born in Wollongong, New South Wales. She grew up in the suburb of Woonona. She has worked for the ALP since the age of 16.

Politics
Byrnes worked as a staffer to Cunningham MP Sharon Bird for 18 years,  including as chief of staff. Following Bird's retirement, she won ALP preselection for Cunningham in February 2022. She was chosen unopposed following the withdrawal of her main opponent, Misha Zelinsky. At the 2022 Federal Election, she was elected to the seat of Cunningham with 65% of the vote.

Personal life
Byrnes is married to Paul Scully, an ALP member of the New South Wales Legislative Assembly. She has sometimes used the name "Alison Byrnes-Scully".

See also

Women in the Australian House of Representatives

References

Living people
21st-century Australian politicians
21st-century Australian women politicians
People from Wollongong
Year of birth missing (living people)
Australian Labor Party members of the Parliament of Australia
Members of the Australian House of Representatives
Members of the Australian House of Representatives for Cunningham
Women members of the Australian House of Representatives